Ball Butte is a volcanic mountain of the Cascades in Deschutes County, Oregon, United States. Its summit has an elevation of 8,091 feet and is located southeast of Broken Top. It is a popular back-country skiing area and is best accessed from the Dutchman Flat Sno-Park or the Upper Three Creeks Sno-Park.

References 

Buttes of Oregon
Landforms of Deschutes County, Oregon
Mountains of Oregon
Volcanoes of Oregon